Berwick is a borough in Columbia County, Pennsylvania, United States. As of the 2020 census, Berwick had a population of 10,355. It is one of the two principal communities of the Bloomsburg–Berwick metropolitan area, which covers Columbia and Montour counties, and had a combined population of 85,562 at the 2010 census.

History
Berwick was founded by Evan Owen, a Welsh Quaker and surveyor. He was the son of Hugh Owen from Trefeglwys, Montgomeryshire, Wales. Berwick was named after Berwick-upon-Tweed, England. Situated on the north bank of the Susquehanna River, the borough was first settled in 1769, founded in 1786, and incorporated in 1818.

Light and heavy manufacturing industries, such as American Car and Foundry Company and Wise Potato Chips, have flourished in Berwick, which consolidated with the borough of West Berwick, where 5,512 people lived in 1910, in 1917. The population of Berwick in 1910 was 5,357; in 1920, after consolidation, the population was 12,181; and in 1950 the population peaked at 14,010. The population was 10,477 at the 2010 census.

Berwick is famous for its high school football team, the Bulldogs, who are six time state champions and three time national champions. Berwick is also the home of the 2008 PIAA AAA baseball state champions. It is the school's first ever baseball state championship.

Since 1947, the Berwick Christmas Boulevard, created by the Jaycees, displays over a mile long Christmas show of lights and displays down Market Street. The Berwick Christmas Boulevard is seen by thousands of visitors every year, and it has been a regional favorite for over 60 years. Santa Claus is present every year to serve Berwick's famous Wise Potato Chips to everyone who drives past him.

The Berwick Armory and Jackson Mansion and Carriage House are listed on the National Register of Historic Places.

Geography

Berwick is located in Luzerne County and eastern Columbia County, bordered to the north by Briar Creek Township, to the west by Briar Creek borough, to the south across the Susquehanna River by Mifflin Township, and to the east by Salem Township in Luzerne County. The borough of Nescopeck in Luzerne County is to the southeast, across the Susquehanna.

U.S. Route 11 runs through the center of Berwick as Front Street (one-way northeast) and Second Street (one-way southwest). US 11 leads northeast  to Kingston, across the Susquehanna from Wilkes-Barre, and southwest  to Bloomsburg, the Columbia County seat. Pennsylvania Route 93 shares Front and Second Streets with US 11 in the center of Berwick, but turns south to cross the Susquehanna via the Market Street Bridge to Nescopeck. In the other direction, PA 93 splits west from US 11 as Orange Street and leads  to Orangeville.

The eastern terminus of the Susquehanna, Bloomsburg, and Berwick Railroad was formerly in Berwick. The Pennsylvania Canal (North Branch Division) formerly went along the Susquehanna River at Berwick, where there was a lock that raised or lowered canal boats .

Climate
The Köppen Climate Classification subtype for this climate is "Dfb" (Warm Summer Continental Climate).

Demographics

As of the 2000 census,  there were 10,774 people, 4,595 households, and 2,802 families residing in the borough. The racial makeup of the borough was 97.10% White, 0.88% African American, 0.28% Native American, 0.43% Asian, 0.05% Pacific Islander, 0.61% from other races, and 0.65% from two or more races. Hispanic or Latino of any race were 1.62% of the population.

The Berwick area had a large influx of immigrants approximately between 1890 and 1920, which had a great impact on the current population that continues to this day. These immigrants included Slovaks, Ukrainians, Ruthenians, Lithuanians, and Poles. These immigrants were primarily Eastern Catholic and Roman Catholic.

There were 4,595 households, out of which 26.4% had children under the age of 18 living with them, 43.8% were married couples living together, 12.3% had a female householder with no husband present, and 39.0% were non-families. 33.6% of all households were made up of individuals, and 17.0% had someone living alone who was 65 years of age or older. The average household size was 2.28 and the average family size was 2.90.

In the borough, the population was spread out, with 23.1% under the age of 18, 7.7% from 18 to 24, 27.1% from 25 to 44, 21.5% from 45 to 64, and 20.7% who were 65 years of age or older. The median age was 40 years. For every 100 females, there were 87.8 males. For every 100 females age 18 and over, there were 84.6 males.

The median income for a household in the borough was $27,442, and the median income for a family was $32,357. Males had a median income of $26,467 versus $21,061 for females. The per capita income for the borough was $14,538. About 9.6% of families and 14.9% of the population were below the poverty line, including 20.8% of those under age 18 and 11.1% of those age 65 or over.

Economy
 
Berwick was one of the places where the Stuart tank was produced in World War II, with over 15,000 of the tanks being manufactured at an American Car & Foundry plant in the town. The American Car & Foundry plant was also a producer of rolling stock for railroads. The borough is home to Berwick Offray, a gift ribbon manufacturing division of CSS Industries, and Wise Foods, a snack food company founded by Berwick native Earl Wise in the first half of the twentieth century, famous for its potato chips.

Education
Berwick is home to the Berwick Area School District. There are six public schools located within the district: Berwick Area High School, Berwick Area Middle School, Nescopeck Elementary School, and Salem Elementary School. According to the Pennsylvania Department of Education, as of the 2009–10 school year, 94% of all students in the district attend class regularly and 88% of all students graduate on time.

Berwick is also served by Columbia-Montour Area Vocational-Technical School, Central Susquehanna Intermediate Unit 16, as well as a private school: Holy Family School (a Catholic-based school for grades Pre-4th). Holy Family also offers C.C.D

Berwick is home to a dedicated campus of Luzerne County Community College, located in the Eagles Building. Nearby colleges and universities include Bloomsburg University (12.4 mi), Penn State Hazleton (14.2 mi), the main campus of Luzerne County Community College in Nanticoke (21.9 mi), King's College (28.2 mi), and Wilkes University (28.2 mi).

The McBride Memorial Library, opened to the public in January 2008, serves the residents of Berwick and its surrounding areas have the Bloomsburg Public Library, the Orangeville Public Library, and libraries at those colleges and universities listed above.

Notable people
 Nick Adams, actor (interred)
 Thomas Bowman, Methodist Episcopal bishop
 Russ Canzler, baseball player - third base
 Zehnder Confair, Pennsylvania State Senator
 George Curry, football coach
 John Gordner, Pennsylvania State Senator
 Matt Karchner, baseball pitcher
 Jake Kelchner, football quarterback
 Douglas Major, composer of sacred music and concert organist
 Warren P. Noble, congressman
 Bo Orlando, football player
 Billy Petrolle, boxer
 Tony Piet, baseball player
 Ron Powlus, football quarterback
 Benjamin F. Rittenhouse, Civil War hero
 Richard Sharpe Shaver, writer and artist
 Mike Souchak, golfer
 Jimmy Spencer, racecar driver and commentator
 Ted Stuban, politician
 Jayson Terdiman, Olympic luger
 Joe Torsella, Pennsylvania State Treasurer
 William H. Woodin, FDR's first Treasury Secretary

Photo gallery

References

External links

 Borough of Berwick official website
 Berwick Historical Society

1818 establishments in Pennsylvania
Bloomsburg–Berwick metropolitan area
Boroughs in Columbia County, Pennsylvania
Pennsylvania populated places on the Susquehanna River
Populated places established in 1769